Sparkman High School is a public high school in Harvest, Alabama, United States in the Madison County Schools district. The school was named after senator and former vice presidential nominee John Jackson Sparkman. Sparkman is one of the largest high schools in northern Alabama and serves students in grades 10-12. The school's mascot is a Senator. The school has an enrollment of around 2,400 students. Sparkman High's main rivals are Bob Jones High School and James Clemens High School.

In 2006, the Sparkman Ninth Grade School was built next to the high school.

Campus

Sparkman High was originally located in Toney. The old building is now Sparkman Middle School. Now located on Jeff Road in Harvest, the current high school building was built in 1997. The facility has art rooms, two gyms, a photo studio, drama rooms, a choir room, a band room, three JROTC rooms and musical theater classes. In 2001, additional rooms were built to accommodate the overcrowding. The high school has now split; the Sparkman 9th Grade School, which is across the street from the main high school, opened in 2006 to help overcrowding. There are currently around 607 freshmen at Sparkman 9; Sparkman High has over 1,800 students at the 10-12th grade building.

Notable alumni
 Adia, musician
 Caitlin Carver, actress
 Bruce Maxwell, Major League Baseball player
 Izzy Miller, musician
 Steve Raby, 2010 Democratic nominee for U.S. Representative
 Dale Strong, U.S. Representative (2023–Present)
 Jay-R Strowbridge, former professional basketball player
 Jonathan Wallace, former professional basketball player
 Andy Whitt, Alabama State Representative (2018-Present)

John J. Sparkman Award
Dating back to 1973, the John J. Sparkman Award is given by the Sparkman High School faculty to the student who exhibits leadership, scholarship, service, and good character. This prestigious award is only given to one student every year, and is also the only award given during the graduation ceremony. Listed are the recipients of this award:

 Jacob Ladon Edwards, 2022
 Madison Leigh Duboise, 2021
 Saylor Grace Cuzzort, 2020
 Ryan Michael Dahl, 2019
 Grant Andrew Whitt, 2018
 Braden Parrish Garrison, 2017
 Christopher Franklin Little, 2016
 Kyle David Anderson, 2015
 Victoria Celeste Jones, 2014
 Patrick Donovan Fitzgerald, 2013
 Corban Nathaniel Swain, 2012
 Hannah Maria Wallace, 2011
 Alicia Dalia Perez, 2010
 Adrienne Nicole Webb, 2009
 Robert Daniel Weaver, 2008
 Garfield Wilbur Boon, 2007
 Veronica Yvonne Colon, 2006
 Wesley Earl Alexander, 2005
 Jonathan Lewis Alexander, 2004
 Morgan Ashley Chatman, 2003
 Brian Dale Christopher Davis, 2002
 Ronald Joseph Unger, 2001
 Jason William Parks, 2000
 Richard Ford Taylor, 1999
 Alicia Ann Raby, 1998
 Charles Raymond Waits, 1997
 Nicholas Lee Burrows, 1996
 Leah Marie Haney, 1995
 Robert Kevin White, 1994
 DyShaun Muhammad, 1993
 Teresa Carol Atkins, 1992
 Kevin Wayne Neal, 1991
 Ophelia Agatha Maynard, 1990
 Jennifer Benita Turner, 1989
 Davis Reynolds Schmitz, 1988
 Bethany Jill Powell, 1987
 Monica McCorvey Outland, 1986
 Laura Kay Kimbrough, 1985
 Teresa Corlette Wilson, 1984
 Leigh Ann Noel, 1983
 John Wade Shirley, 1982
 Timothy Vann King, 1981
 Lisa Louise Nunley, 1980
 Stephen Rock Nelson, 1979
 Cecelia Lucinda Carter, 1978
 Shelia Diane Bradley, 1977
 Stephen James Chitwood, 1976
 Roger S. Stephenson, 1975
 David Leonard Sparks, 1974
 Isadore Lane & Deborah K. Hardgrove, 1973

References

External links
 Sparkman High School official site
 Sparkman Ninth Grade School official site
 About Sparkman
 Basketball teams
 Football team
 Sparkman High Marching Band

Public high schools in Alabama
Schools in Madison County, Alabama
Educational institutions established in 1958
1958 establishments in Alabama